Upton Magna railway station was a station in Upton Magna, Shropshire, England. 

Initially the station had no platforms at track level, nor any buildings on the westbound side - these were subsequently added later. Goods sidings, a loop and a signal box were provided on the southbound side of the line by 1895.  

The station closed to goods traffic on 4 May 1964 and completely a few months later on 7 September. The buildings and platforms were swiftly demolished and the sidings removed, though the goods loop and signal box survived until May 1967.  

The station house still stands some distance from the lineside in 2016 (now in private residential use), but all other traces of the station have disappeared.

References

Further reading

Disused railway stations in Shropshire
Railway stations in Great Britain opened in 1849
Railway stations in Great Britain closed in 1964
1849 establishments in England
1964 disestablishments in England
Former Shrewsbury and Wellington Joint Railway stations